Papakura North is a suburb of Auckland, in northern New Zealand. Located on the eastern shores of the Pahurehure Inlet, approximately 30 kilometres south of Auckland CBD under authority of the Auckland Council. The suburb makes up the area between the  Papakura Town Centre and Takanini, making up the southernmost part of the Auckland metropolitan area.

Papakura North is home to the national headquarters of the New Zealand Special Air Service, a branch of the New Zealand Army.

History

Papakura North became recognised as an independent suburb when the Papakura District was overtaken by  Auckland's urban sprawl, and was separated from the other areas east and west of the town centre. The previous area was referred to as a small area of greater Papakura, but has now developed into a single suburban area. The boundaries of the 2018 statistical area of Papakura North are approximately Porchester Road, Willis Road, Cameron Street and Grove Road, and Battalion Drive.

Arimu Road and Russell Road properties were originally vacated by army personnel, until the mid-1990s when they were sold off for private use. However this area still remains a Defence Area as ordered by the NZ SAS for security purposes. Access points to the Papakura Military Camp on Russell Road and Walters Road are secured by electric fencing and the area is not listed in Google Maps. The speed limit down the north side of Arimu Road still remains 30 km/h and the surrounding area is often monitored by army staff. Training exercises often take place in the restricted camp area.

Demographics

Papakura North had a population of 4,185 at the 2018 New Zealand census, an increase of 375 people (9.8%) since the 2013 census, and an increase of 846 people (25.3%) since the 2006 census. There were 1,293 households, comprising 2,055 males and 2,130 females, giving a sex ratio of 0.96 males per female. The median age was 30.6 years (compared with 37.4 years nationally), with 1,056 people (25.2%) aged under 15 years, 969 (23.2%) aged 15 to 29, 1,779 (42.5%) aged 30 to 64, and 378 (9.0%) aged 65 or older.

Ethnicities were 53.1% European/Pākehā, 32.0% Māori, 16.8% Pacific peoples, 17.8% Asian, and 2.6% other ethnicities. People may identify with more than one ethnicity.

The percentage of people born overseas was 24.7, compared with 27.1% nationally.

Although some people chose not to answer the census's question about religious affiliation, 43.1% had no religion, 33.6% were Christian, 2.8% had Māori religious beliefs, 5.4% were Hindu, 1.8% were Muslim, 1.2% were Buddhist and 4.9% had other religions.

Of those at least 15 years old, 486 (15.5%) people had a bachelor's or higher degree, and 669 (21.4%) people had no formal qualifications. The median income was $31,000, compared with $31,800 nationally. 366 people (11.7%) earned over $70,000 compared to 17.2% nationally. The employment status of those at least 15 was that 1,641 (52.4%) people were employed full-time, 354 (11.3%) were part-time, and 174 (5.6%) were unemployed.

External links
Auckland Council

References

Suburbs of Auckland